Caroline Maher is a member of the Egyptian Parliament. She is a taekwondo player.

References

21st-century Egyptian women politicians
21st-century Egyptian politicians
Year of birth missing (living people)
Living people
Egyptian female taekwondo practitioners
The American University in Cairo alumni